José Pardas (born 25 June 1955) is a Spanish rower. He competed in the men's coxless pair event at the 1980 Summer Olympics.

References

1955 births
Living people
Spanish male rowers
Olympic rowers of Spain
Rowers at the 1980 Summer Olympics
Place of birth missing (living people)